Kipelovo is a rural locality (a settlement) in Staroselskoye Rural Settlement, Vologodsky District, Vologda Oblast, Russia. The population was 882 as of 2002. There are 7 streets.

Geography 
Kipelovo is located 52 km northwest of Vologda (the district's administrative centre) by road. Gureikha is the nearest rural locality.

References 

Rural localities in Vologodsky District